Walter John Greenlands (1899–1958) was an Australian rugby league player who played in the 1920s and 1930s.

Playing career
Greenlands played two seasons for St. George between 1929 and 1930. The highlight of his career was when he played in St George's 1930 Grand Final loss to Western Suburbs.

Death
Greenlands died in Corrimal, New South Wales on 23 February 1958, aged 58.

References

St. George Dragons players
Australian rugby league players
1899 births
1958 deaths
Rugby league centres